In mathematical analysis, the Schur test, named after German mathematician Issai Schur, is a bound on the  operator norm of an integral operator in terms of its Schwartz kernel (see Schwartz kernel theorem).

Here is one version. Let  be two measurable spaces  (such as ).

for almost all  and

for almost all , then  extends to a continuous operator  with the operator norm

Such functions ,  are called the Schur test functions.

Common usage and Young's inequality

A common usage of the Schur test is to take  Then we get:

This inequality is valid no matter whether the Schwartz kernel  is non-negative or not.

A similar statement about  operator norms is known as Young's inequality for integral operators:

if

Proof

Using the Cauchy–Schwarz inequality and inequality (1), we get:

It follows that  for any .

See also

 Hardy–Littlewood–Sobolev inequality

References

Inequalities